The Blurred Lines Tour was the debut headlining tour by American recording artist, Robin Thicke. The tour supported his sixth studio album, Blurred Lines (2013). The tour traveled to North America and Europe, playing over 30 concerts.

Background
Thicke first mentioned tour shortly following the release of the album. He stated he wanted to spend of the rest of the year promoting the album internationally. The end of 2013 saw the singer performing at many radio festivals, followed by a guest spot on Maroon 5's 2014 UK tour.

The tour was announced in September 2013. Before the tour began, it was faced it many challenges. In January 2014, opening act Jessie J dropped out of the tour, stating she wanted to focus on making new music. The following month, the singer revealed his separation from this wife, Paula Patton. Shortly after, the first three shows of the tour was rescheduled, citing vocal stress as the reasoning. Thicke was photographed in Canada and Disneyland during the cancelled shows. The tour kicked off Fairfax, Virginia. At each show, Thicke dedicated "Lost Without U" to his estranged wife.

The Humanists of Boston University petitioned to have Thicke's concert at the Agganis Arena cancelled. The group stated the album's lead single promoted misogyny and rape culture. The university responded the school is not in correlation with the concert, with the show being organized by Live Nation. The group created a petition on Change.org, getting over a three-thousand signatures. The concert proceeded as scheduled, with the group stating a small protest outside the arena.

During a break in the tour, Thicke recorded his next studio album, Paula. This saw the singer adding songs from the new album to the tour's setlist. The album was released in July 2014 and performed poorly.

Opening acts
DJ Cassidy 
K. Michelle

Setlist
The following setlist was obtained from the concert held on July 26, 2014; at the Casino Rama Entertainment Centre in Rama, Canada. It does not represent all concerts for the duration of the tour. 
"Give It 2 U"
"Magic"
"Take It Easy on Me"
"Oh Shooter"
"Dreamworld"
"Pretty Lil Heart"
"Lost Without U"
"Instrumental Interlude"
"Too Little Too Late"
"Love Can Grow Back"
"Wanna Love You Girl"
"Lock the Door"
"Get Her Back"
"Shakin' It 4 Daddy"
"Rock with You" 
"Let's Stay Together"
Encore
"Blurred Lines"
"Forever Love"

Tour dates

Festivals and other miscellaneous performances
This concert was a part of the "Ultimate Party with a Purpose"
This concert was a part of the "Houston Livestock Show and Rodeo"
This concert was a part of the "New Orleans Jazz & Heritage Festival"
This concert was a part of "SunFest"
This concert was a part of the "Soul Beach Music Festival"
This concert was a part of "Mardi Gras"
This concert was a part of the "Wireless Festival"
This concert was a part of the "Monte-Carlo Sporting Summer Festival"
This concert was a part of the "North Sea Jazz Festival"
This concert was a part of the "Montreux Jazz Festival"
This concert was a part of the "Macy's Music Festival"
This concert was a part of the "Indiana State Fair"
This concert was a part of the "Illinois State Fair"

Cancellations and rescheduled shows

Box office score data

References

2014 concert tours